The Breast Cancer Alliance (BCA) is a non-profit organization that supports breast cancer research, breast cancer-related training for medical professionals and efforts to increase access to cancer screenings and treatment for low-income women. As of 2011, it was the fourth-largest private funder of breast cancer research in the U.S. It was founded in 1996 by Mary Waterman, and its headquarters are in Greenwich, Connecticut.

The mission of the BCA is to fund innovative breast cancer research and to promote breast health through education and outreach. As of 2015, the organization had awarded over $20 million to fund research and educational and outreach programs since its inception.

The corporate sponsors of the BCA include many Fortune 500 companies, including J.P. Morgan Chase & Co. and PepsiCo. 

The annual luncheon for the BCA attracts over 800 people, including many celebrities, and raises close to $2 million.

Sources

External links 
The Breast Cancer Alliance official website

Breast cancer organizations
Cancer charities in the United States
Charities based in Connecticut
Medical and health organizations based in Connecticut